Yeaveley is a civil parish in the Derbyshire Dales district of Derbyshire, England.  The parish contains nine listed buildings that are recorded in the National Heritage List for England. Of these, one is listed at Grade I, the highest of the three grades, one is at Grade II*, the middle grade, and the others are at Grade II, the lowest grade.  The parish contains the village of Yeaveley and the surrounding countryside.  The oldest listed building in the parish consists of the remains of a preceptory of the Knights Hospitaller.  The other listed buildings are houses and associated structures, farmhouses and farm buildings, and a church.


Key

Buildings

References

Citations

Sources

 

Lists of listed buildings in Derbyshire